The sensitivity index or discriminability index or detectability index is a dimensionless statistic used in signal detection theory. A higher index indicates that the signal can be more readily detected.

Definition
The discriminability index is the separation between the means of two distributions (typically the signal and the noise distributions), in units of the standard deviation.

Equal variances/covariances
 .

In higher dimensions, i.e. with two multivariate distributions with the same variance-covariance matrix , (whose symmetric square-root, the standard deviation matrix, is ), this generalizes to the Mahalanobis distance between the two distributions:
 ,
where  is the 1d slice of the sd along the unit vector  through the means, i.e. the  equals the  along the 1d slice through the means.

Unequal variances/covariances

Bayes discriminability index
This is the maximum (Bayes-optimal) discriminability index for two distributions, based on the amount of their overlap, i.e. the optimal (Bayes) error of classification  by an ideal observer, or its complement, the optimal accuracy :
 ,
where  is the inverse cumulative distribution function of the standard normal. The Bayes discriminability between univariate or multivariate normal distributions can be numerically computed  (Matlab code), and may also be used as an approximation when the distributions are close to normal.

 is a positive-definite statistical distance measure that is free of assumptions about the distributions, like the Kullback-Leibler divergence .  is asymmetric, whereas  is symmetric for the two distributions. However,  does not satisfy the triangle inequality, so it is not a full metric. 

In particular, for a yes/no task between two univariate normal distributions with means  and variances , the Bayes-optimal classification accuracies are:

 ,

The Bayes discriminability 

 can also be computed from the ROC curve of a yes/no task between two univariate normal distributions with a single shifting criterion. It can also be computed from the ROC curve of any two distributions (in any number of variables) with a shifting likelihood-ratio, by locating the point on the ROC curve that is farthest from the diagonal. 

. The Bayes discriminability .

RMS sd discriminability index
A common approximate (i.e. sub-optimal) discriminability index that has a closed-form is to take the average of the variances, i.e. the rms of the two standard deviations:   (also denoted by ). It is  times the -score of the area under the receiver operating characteristic curve (AUC) of a single-criterion observer.

Average sd discriminability index

Comparison of the indices
It has been shown that for two univariate normal distributions, and for multivariate normal distributions,  still.

Thus,  and  underestimate the maximum discriminability  of univariate normal distributions.  can underestimate  by a maximum of approximately 30%. These results often hold true in higher dimensions, but not always.

See also
 Receiver operating characteristic (ROC)
 Summary statistics
 Effect size

References

External links

 Interactive signal detection theory tutorial including calculation of d′.

Detection theory
Signal processing
Summary statistics